973 Aralia (prov. designation:  or ) is an asteroid of the Ursula family located in the outer regions of the asteroid belt, approximately  in diameter. It was discovered on 18 March 1922, by German astronomer Karl Reinmuth at the Heidelberg Observatory in southern Germany. The Xk-type asteroid has a rotation period of 7.3 hours. It was named after the genus of ivy-like plant Aralia, also known as "spikenard".

Orbit and classification 

Aralia is a core member of the Ursula family, a large family of C- and X-type asteroids, named after 375 Ursula. It orbits the Sun in the outer main-belt at a distance of 2.9–3.6 AU once every 5 years and 9 months (2,103 days; semi-major axis of 3.21 AU). Its orbit has an eccentricity of 0.11 and an inclination of 16° with respect to the ecliptic. The body's observation arc begins at Vienna Observatory on 28 March 1922, or 10 days after its official discovery observation at Heidelberg.

Naming 

This minor planet was named after the genus of the Eurasian ivy-like plant Aralia, also known as "spikenard". A member of the Ginseng family, it has evergreen leaves, small yellowish flowers, and black berries. The  in The Names of the Minor Planets by Paul Herget in 1955.

Physical characteristics 

In the SMASS classification, Aralia is a Xk-type, a transitional subtype of the X-type to the less common K-type asteroids. In both the Tholen- and SMASS-like taxonomy of the Small Solar System Objects Spectroscopic Survey (S3OS2), it is an X-type asteroid. The overall spectral type of the Ursula family is that of a C and X-type.

Rotation period 

In May 2015, a rotational lightcurve of Aralia was obtained from photometric observations by Julian Oey, Hasen Williams and Roger Groom at the Blue Mountains Observatory  and Darling Range Observatory (DRO). Lightcurve analysis gave a rotation period of  hours with a brightness variation of  magnitude.

Diameter and albedo 

According to the surveys carried out by the Infrared Astronomical Satellite IRAS, the NEOWISE mission of NASA's Wide-field Infrared Survey Explorer (WISE), and the Japanese Akari satellite, Aralia measures between 51.6 and 55.5 kilometers in diameter and its surface an albedo between 0.08 and 0.10. The Collaborative Asteroid Lightcurve Link derives an albedo of 0.0614 and a diameter of 51.24 kilometers based on an absolute magnitude of 10.1.

References

External links 
 Lightcurve Database Query (LCDB), at www.minorplanet.info
 Dictionary of Minor Planet Names, Google books
 Discovery Circumstances: Numbered Minor Planets (1)-(5000) – Minor Planet Center
 
 

000973
Discoveries by Karl Wilhelm Reinmuth
Named minor planets
000973
19220318